

Events
 Reinmar von Zweter starts writing his first poems for Frederick II, Duke of Austria

Works
 William the Clerk of Normandy composes Besant de Dieu, an allegorical poem, and Les treis moz de l'evesque de Lincoln

Births

Deaths

13th-century poetry
Poetry